The bushy-tailed hairy-footed gerbil (Gerbillurus vallinus) is a species of rodent found in Namibia and South Africa. Its natural habitats are dry savanna, temperate grassland, and hot deserts. It is threatened by habitat loss.

References

Gerbillurus
Rodents of Africa
Mammals described in 1918
Taxa named by Oldfield Thomas
Taxonomy articles created by Polbot